Nordea Bank Polska was a name of bank,  part of Nordea in Poland - the largest Scandinavian financial group.

Nordea Bank Polska was established first as "Bank Komunalny" in 1992, the Nordea Group became a strategic investor in 1999. By the end of 2001, Bank Komunalny was fully consolidated into Nordea.

It had identified itself as a modern bank offering banking services via the Internet, telephone, free-of-charge personalized SMS’s, WAP, and a network of branches. Its electronic banking had been created on the basis of the Scandinavian Solo system, which processes banking operations executed via the Internet.

Since 2010 Nordea is represented in Poland by Nordea Bank AB SA Branch in Poland; established to serve the Nordic business units in the operations centre located in Lodz and the IT Division located in Gdynia, Gdansk and Warsaw. Nordea employs more than 4,500 employees in Poland.

Acquisition to PKO 
On Jun 12, 2013, Nordea Bank Polska was sold to PKO Bank Polski. Source cites reasons as "increased competition and lower revenue from lending after demand for goods and services fell"  and "tougher rules, including the need to float 25 percent of the local subsidiary on the stock market". Later story added up on various sides of situation in banking of Poland: external causes to exit market by foreign banking conglomerates, internal pressure in Poland and PKO particular ambitions in area.

References 

Banks of Poland
Banks established in 2001
Companies listed on the Warsaw Stock Exchange
2001 establishments in Poland